Musc or MUSC may refer to:

 MuSC (muscle stem cell), a type of cell
 Abel Santamaría Airport (ICAO airport code MUSC), Santa Clara, Villa Clara, Cuba
 Medical University of South Carolina
 Monash University Malaysia (Monash University Sunway Campus)
 Macquarie University Students' Council
 McMaster University Student Centre
 Marian University (Indiana) Sports Club
 Manchester United Supporters Club for Manchester United F.C.
 Músc, an Irish surname of the Clan Corcu Duibne
 Músc, an Irish surname of the Clan Múscraige

See also 

 
 
 
 
 Musk (disambiguation)